Eoacemyia is a genus of bristle flies in the family Tachinidae.

Species
Eoacemyia errans (Wiedemann, 1824)

Distribution
China, India, Sumatra, Malaysia, Singapore, Papua New Guinea.

References

Exoristinae
Diptera of Asia
Tachinidae genera
Taxa named by Charles Henry Tyler Townsend